The Immediate Geographic Region of Pedra Azul is one of the 7 immediate geographic regions in the Intermediate Geographic Region of Teófilo Otoni, one of the 70 immediate geographic regions in the Brazilian state of Minas Gerais and one of the 509 of Brazil, created by the National Institute of Geography and Statistics (IBGE) in 2017.

Municipalities 
It comprises 7 municipalities.

 Águas Vermelhas   
 Cachoeira de Pajeú    
 Comercinho    
 Divisa Alegre      
 Divisópolis   
 Medina     
 Pedra Azul

See also 

 List of Intermediate and Immediate Geographic Regions of Minas Gerais

References 

Geography of Minas Gerais